is a Japanese animator and animation director, best known for Creamy Mami, the Magic Angel. He was born in Fuchuu-shi, Tokyo. He belongs to Ajia-do Animation Works. In 1963, he entered Toei Animation at the same time as Tsutomu Shibayama and Hayao Miyazaki. He was a chief animator working with Shibayama after having transferred to a A Production (predecessor to Shin-Ei Animation). He established Ajia-do Animation Works with Shibayama in 1978.

Filmography
 Creamy Mami, the Magic Angel
 Kimagure Orange Road
 Onegai! Samia-don
 Chiisana Obake Acchi, Kocchi, Socchi

References

External links

1945 births
Living people
People from Fuchū, Tokyo
Anime directors
Japanese animators
Japanese animated film directors